Capuzzi is an Italian surname. Notable people with the surname include:

Antonio Capuzzi (1755–1818), Italian violinist and composer
Giacomo Capuzzi (born 1929), Italian Roman Catholic bishop
Jim Capuzzi (born 1932), American football player
Rinaldo Capuzzi (1904–1991), Italian sport shooter

Italian-language surnames